Todd County is a county in the U.S. state of South Dakota. As of the 2020 United States Census, the population was 9,319. Todd County does not have its own county seat. Instead, Winner in neighboring Tripp County serves as its administrative center. Its largest city is Mission. The county was created in 1909, although it remains unorganized. The county was named for John Blair Smith Todd, a delegate from Dakota Territory to the United States House of Representatives and a Civil War general.

The county lies entirely within the Rosebud Indian Reservation and is coterminous with the main reservation (exclusive of off-reservation trust lands, which lie in four nearby counties). Its southern border is with the state of Nebraska. It is one of five South Dakota counties entirely within an Indian reservation. The county's per-capita income makes it the third poorest county in the United States. Unlike many rural counties in South Dakota, since 1960, its net population has increased.

History
Until 1981 Todd, Shannon (now Oglala Lakota), and Washabaugh were the last unorganized counties in the United States. Although then organized, Todd did not receive a home rule charter until 1983. It contracts with Tripp County for its Auditor, Treasurer, and Registrar of Deeds.

Geography
Todd County lies on the south line of South Dakota. Its south boundary line abuts the north boundary line of the state of Nebraska. Its terrain consists of semi-arid rolling hills, cut by gullies and drainages which flow to the northeast. The land is partially dedicated to agriculture, including center pivot irrigation. The terrain slopes to the northeast, and its highest point is near the SW corner, at 3,176' (968m) ASL.

The eastern portion of South Dakota's counties (48 of 66) observe Central Time; the western counties (18 of 66) observe Mountain Time. Todd County is the westernmost of the SD counties to observe Central Time.

Major highways
 U.S. Highway 18
 U.S. Highway 83
 South Dakota Highway 63

Adjacent counties

 Mellette County - north
 Tripp County - east
 Cherry County, Nebraska - south (western half observes Mountain Time)
 Keya Paha County, Nebraska - southeast
 Bennett County - west (observes Mountain Time)
 Jackson County - northwest (observes Mountain Time)

Protected areas
 Hollow Horn Bear Village

Lakes
 Antelope Lake
 He Dog Lake
 White Lake

Demographics

2000 census
As of the 2000 census, there were 9,050 people, 2,462 households, and 1,917 families in the county. The population density was 6 people per square mile (3/km2). There were 2,766 housing units at an average density of 2 per square mile (1/km2). The racial makeup of the county was 85.60% Native American, 12.57% White, 0.09% Black or African American, 0.14% Asian, 0.21% from other races, and 1.38% from two or more races. 1.52% of the population were Hispanic or Latino of any race.

There were 2,462 households, out of which 48.90% had children under the age of 18 living with them, 35.20% were married couples living together, 31.80% had a female householder with no husband present, and 22.10% were non-families. 18.90% of all households were made up of individuals, and 5.20% had someone living alone who was 65 years of age or older. The average household size was 3.62 and the average family size was 4.09.

The county population contained 44.00% under the age of 18, 10.40% from 18 to 24, 25.10% from 25 to 44, 14.80% from 45 to 64, and 5.80% who were 65 years of age or older. The median age was 22 years. For every 100 females there were 97.90 males. For every 100 females age 18 and over, there were 92.30 males.

The median income for a household in the county was $20,035, and the median income for a family was $19,533. Males had a median income of $20,993 as opposed to $21,449 for females. The per capita income for the county was $7,714. About 44.00% of families and 48.30% of the population were below the poverty line, including 57.60% of those under age 18 and 33.50% of those age 65 or over. The county's per-capita income makes it one of the poorest counties in the United States.

2010 census
As of the 2010 United States Census, there were 9,612 people, 2,780 households, and 2,091 families in the county. The racial makeup of the county was 88.1% American Indian, 9.6% white, 0.2% black or African American, 0.2% Asian, 0.2% from other races, and 1.8% from two or more races. Those of Hispanic or Latino origin made up 2.4% of the population. In terms of ancestry, 5.1% were German, and 1.1% were American.

Of the 2,780 households, 55.9% had children under the age of 18 living with them, 28.5% were married couples living together, 34.7% had a female householder with no husband present, 24.8% were non-families, and 21.1% of all households were made up of individuals. The average household size was 3.45 and the average family size was 3.95. The median age was 24.0 years.

The median income for a household in the county was $25,196 and the median income for a family was $29,010. Males had a median income of $26,971 versus $30,211 for females. The per capita income for the county was $11,010. About 44.2% of families and 48.8% of the population were below the poverty line, including 59.0% of those under age 18 and 45.7% of those age 65 or over.

Communities

City
 Mission

Town
 St. Francis

Census-designated places

 Antelope
 Okreek
 Parmelee
 Rosebud
 Sicangu Village
 Soldier Creek
 Spring Creek
 Two Strike
 White Horse

Other unincorporated communities

 Grass Mountain
 HeDog
 Hidden Timber
 Olsonville

Unorganized territories
 East Todd
 West Todd

Politics
Todd County heavily leans Democratic in politics. Similar to most other Native American-majority counties, Hillary Clinton won the majority of votes in Todd County in 2016. In 2020, Joe Biden received a larger majority of the county vote. The last election in which the Republican nominee won the county was in 1960 which the Richard Nixon-Henry Cabot Lodge Jr. ticket carried the county.

See also
 National Register of Historic Places listings in Todd County, South Dakota

References

 
1909 establishments in South Dakota
Populated places established in 1909